The diplomatic foreign relations of the United Kingdom are conducted by the Foreign, Commonwealth and Development Office, headed by the Foreign Secretary. The prime minister and numerous other agencies play a role in setting policy, and many institutions and businesses have a voice and a role.

The United Kingdom was the world's foremost power during the 19th and early 20th centuries, most notably during the so-called "Pax Britannica"a period of totally unrivaled supremacy and unprecedented international peace during the mid-to-late 1800s. The country continued to be widely considered a superpower until the Suez crisis of 1956, and this embarrassing incident coupled with the loss of the empire left the UK's dominant role in global affairs to be gradually diminished. Nevertheless, the United Kingdom remains a great power and a permanent member of the United Nations Security Council, a founding member of the G7, G8, G20, NATO, AUKUS, OECD, WTO, Council of Europe, OSCE, and the Commonwealth of Nations, the latter being a legacy of the British Empire. The UK had been a member state of the European Union (and a member of its predecessors) since 1973.  However, due to the outcome of a 2016 membership referendum, proceedings to withdraw from the EU began in 2017 and concluded when the UK formally left the EU on 31 January 2020, and the transition period on 31 December 2020 with an EU trade agreement. Since the vote and the conclusion of trade talks with the EU, policymakers have begun pursuing new trade agreements with other global partners.

History

Following the formation of the Kingdom of Great Britain (which united England and Scotland) in 1707, British foreign relations largely continued those of the Kingdom of England. British foreign policy initially focused on achieving a balance of power within Europe, with no one country achieving dominance over the affairs of the continent. This policy remained a major justification for Britain's wars against Napoleon, and for British involvement in the First and Second World Wars. Secondly Britain continued the expansion of its colonial "First British Empire" by migration and investment.

France was the chief enemy until the defeat of Napoleon in 1815. It had a much larger population and a more powerful army, but a weaker navy. The British were generally successful in their many wars. The notable exception, the American War of Independence (1775–1783), saw Britain, without any major allies, defeated by the American colonials who had the support of France, the Netherlands and (indirectly) Spain. A favoured British diplomatic strategy involved subsidising the armies of continental allies (such as Prussia), thereby turning London's enormous financial power to military advantage. Britain relied heavily on its Royal Navy for security, seeking to keep it the most powerful fleet afloat, eventually with a full complement of bases across the globe. British dominance of the seas was vital to the formation and maintaining of the British Empire, which was achieved through the support of a navy larger than the next two largest navies combined, prior to 1920. The British generally stood alone until the early 20th century, when it became friendly with the U.S. and made alliances with Japan, France and Russia. Germany was now the main antagonist.

1814–1914

The 100 years were generally peaceful--a sort of Pax Britannica enforced by the Royal Navy.  There were two important wars, both limited in scope. The Crimean War (1853–1856) saw the defeat of Russia and its threat to the Ottoman Empire. The Second Boer War (1899–1902) saw the defeat of the two Boer republics in South Africa. London became the world's financial centre, and commercial enterprise expanded across the globe. The "Second British Empire" was built with a base in Asia (especially India) and Africa.

First World War

1920s

After 1918 Britain was a "troubled giant" that was less of a dominant diplomatic force in the 1920s than before. It often had to give way to the United States, which frequently exercised its financial superiority.  The main themes of British foreign policy included a leading role at the Paris Peace Conference of 1919–1920, where Lloyd George worked hard to moderate French demands for revenge on Germany. He was partly successful, but Britain soon had to moderate French policy toward Germany further, as in the Locarno Treaties of 1925.  Furthermore, Britain obtained "mandates" that allowed it and its dominions to govern most of the former German and Ottoman colonies.

Britain became an active member of the new League of Nations, but its list of major achievements was slight.

Disarmament was high on the agenda, and Britain played a major role following the United States in the Washington Naval Conference of 1921 in working toward naval disarmament of the major powers.  By 1933 disarmament agreements had collapsed and the issue became rearming for a war against Germany. 

Britain was partially successful in negotiating better terms with United States regarding the large war loans which Britain was obliged to repay. Britain supported the American solution to German reparations through the Dawes Plan and the Young Plan. Thereby, Germany paid its annual reparations using money borrowed from New York banks, and Britain used the money received to pay Washington. The Great Depression starting in 1929 put enormous pressure on the British economy. Britain revived Imperial Preference, which meant low tariffs within the British Empire and higher barriers to trade with outside countries. The flow of money from New York dried up, and the system of reparations and payment of debt died in 1931.

In domestic British politics, the emerging Labour Party had a distinctive and suspicious foreign policy based on pacifism. Its leaders believed that peace was impossible because of capitalism, secret diplomacy, and the trade in armaments. Labour stressed material factors that ignored the psychological memories of the Great War and the highly emotional tensions regarding nationalism and the boundaries of countries.  Nevertheless, party leader Ramsay MacDonald devoted much of his attention to European policies.

1930s

Vivid memories of the horrors and deaths of the First World War inclined many Britons—and their leaders in all parties—to pacifism in the interwar era. This led directly to the appeasement of dictators (notably of Mussolini and of Hitler) in order to avoid their threats of war.

The challenge came from those dictators, first from Benito Mussolini, Duce of Italy, then from Adolf Hitler, Führer of a much more powerful Nazi Germany. The League of Nations proved disappointing to its supporters; it failed to resolve any of the threats posed by the dictators. British policy involved "appeasing" them in the hopes they would be satiated. By 1938 it was clear that war was looming, and that Germany had the world's most powerful military. The final act of appeasement came when Britain and France sacrificed Czechoslovakia to Hitler's demands at the Munich Agreement of September 1938. Instead of satiation, Hitler menaced Poland, and at last Prime Minister Neville Chamberlain dropped appeasement and stood firm in promising to defend Poland (31 March 1939). Hitler however cut a deal with Joseph Stalin to divide Eastern Europe (23 August 1939); when Germany did invade Poland in September 1939, Britain and France declared war, and the British Commonwealth followed London's lead.

Second World War

Having signed the Anglo-Polish military alliance in August 1939, Britain and France declared war against Germany in September 1939 in response to Germany's invasion of Poland. This declaration included the Crown colonies and India, which Britain directly controlled. The dominions were independent in foreign policy, though all quickly entered the war against Germany. After the French defeat in June 1940, Britain and its empire stood alone in combat against Germany, until June 1941. The United States gave diplomatic, financial and material support, starting in 1940, especially through Lend Lease, which began in 1941 and attain full strength during 1943. In August 1941, Churchill and Roosevelt met and agreed on the Atlantic Charter, which proclaimed "the rights of all peoples to choose the form of government under which they live" should be respected. This wording was ambiguous and would be interpreted differently by the British, Americans, and nationalist movements.

Starting in December 1941, Japan overran British possessions in Asia, including Hong Kong, Malaya, and especially the key base at Singapore. Japan then  marched into Burma, headed toward India. Churchill's reaction to the entry of the United States into the war was that Britain was now assured of victory and the future of the empire was safe, but the rapid defeats irreversibly harmed Britain's standing and prestige as an imperial power. The realisation that Britain could not defend them pushed Australia and New Zealand into permanent close ties with the United States.

Postwar

Economically in dire straits in 1945 (saddled with debt and dealing with widespread destruction of its infrastructure), Britain systematically reduced its overseas commitments. It pursued an alternate role as an active participant in the Cold War against communism, especially as a founding member of NATO in 1949.

The British had built up a very large worldwide Empire, which peaked in size in 1922, after more than half a century of unchallenged global supremacy. The cumulative costs of fighting two world wars, however, placed a heavy burden upon the home economy, and after 1945 the British Empire rapidly began to disintegrate, with all the major colonies gaining independence. By the mid-to-late 1950s, the UK's status as a superpower was gone in the face of the United States and the Soviet Union. Most former colonies joined the "Commonwealth of Nations", an organisation of fully independent nations now with equal status to the UK. However it attempted no major collective policies. The last major colony, Hong Kong, was handed over to China in 1997. Fourteen British Overseas Territories maintain a constitutional link to the UK, but are not part of the country per se.

Britain slashed its involvements in the Middle East after the humiliating Suez Crisis of 1956. However Britain did forge close military ties with the United States, France, and Germany, through the NATO military alliance. After years of debate (and rebuffs), Britain joined the Common Market in 1973; which became the European Union in 1993. However it did not merge financially, and kept the pound separate from the Euro, which partly isolated it from the EU financial crisis of 2011. In June 2016, the UK voted to leave the EU.

21st century

Foreign policy initiatives of UK governments since the 1990s have included military intervention in conflicts and for peacekeeping, humanitarian assistance programmes and increased aid spending, support for establishment of the International Criminal Court, debt relief for developing countries, prioritisation of initiatives to address climate change, and promotion of free trade. The British approach has been described as "spread the right norms and sustain NATO".

Lunn et al. (2008) argue:
Three key motifs of Tony Blair's 10-year premiership were an activist philosophy of 'interventionism', maintaining a strong alliance with the US and a commitment to placing Britain at the heart of Europe. While the 'special relationship' and the question of Britain's role in Europe have been central to British foreign policy since the Second World War...interventionism was a genuinely new element.

The GREAT campaign of 2012 was one of the most ambitious national promotion efforts ever undertaken by any major nation. It was scheduled take maximum advantage of the worldwide attention to the Summer Olympics in London. The goals were to make British more culture visible in order to stimulate  trade, investment and tourism. The government partnered with key leaders in culture, business, diplomacy and education. The  campaign unified many themes and targets, including business meetings; scholarly conventions; recreational vehicle dealers; parks and campgrounds; convention and visitors bureaus; hotels; bed and breakfast inns; casinos; and hotels.

In 2013, the government of David Cameron described its approach to foreign policy by saying:
For any given foreign policy issue, the UK potentially has a range of options for delivering impact in our national interest. ... [W]e have a complex network of alliances and partnerships through which we can work.... These include – besides the EU – the UN and groupings within it, such as the five permanent members of the Security Council (the “P5”); NATO; the Commonwealth; the Organisation for Economic Cooperation and Development; the G8 and G20 groups of leading industrialised nations; and so on.

The UK began establishing air and naval facilities in the Persian Gulf, located in the United Arab Emirates, Bahrain and Oman in 2014–15. The Strategic Defence and Security Review 2015 highlighted a range of foreign policy initiatives of the UK government. Edward Longinotti notes how current British defence policy is grappling with how to accommodate two major commitments, to Europe and to an ‘east of Suez’ global military strategy, within a modest defence budget that can only fund one. He points out that Britain's December 2014 agreement to open a permanent naval base in Bahrain underlines its gradual re-commitment east of Suez. By some measures, Britain remains the second most powerful country in the world by virtue of its soft power and "logistical capability to deploy, support and sustain [military] forces overseas in large numbers." Although commentators have questioned the need for global power projection, the concept of “Global Britain” put forward by the Conservative government in 2019 signalled more military activity in the Middle East and Pacific, outside of NATO's traditional sphere of influence.

At the end of January 2020, the United Kingdom left the European Union, with a subsequent trade agreement with the EU in effect from 1 January 2021, setting out the terms of the UK-EU economic relationship and what abilities the Foreign, Commonwealth & Development Office can use in foreign relations related to trade.

Major international disputes since 1945
 1946–1949 – involved in Greek Civil War
 1945–1948 – administration of the Mandate for Palestine, ending with the establishment of the State of Israel in 1948. British forces often faced conflict with Arab nationalists and Jewish Zionist militia, including those who in 1946 blew up the King David Hotel, which was British administrative and military HQ, killing 91 people.
 1947–1991 – Cold War with Soviet Union
 1948–1949 – Berlin Blockade – dispute with USSR over access to West Berlin and general Soviet expansionism in Eastern Europe
 1948–1960 – Malayan Emergency – armed conflict against the politically isolated Communist forces of the Malayan National Liberation Army
 1950–1953 – Korean War – war with North Korea
 1951–1954 – Abadan Crisis – dispute with Iran over expropriated oil assets
 1956–1957 – Suez Crisis – armed conflict with Egypt over its seizure of the Suez Canal Zone, and dispute with most of international community
 1958 – First Cod War – fishing dispute with Iceland
 1962–1966 – Konfrontasi – war with Indonesia
 1972–1973 – Second Cod War – fishing dispute with Iceland
 1975–1976 – Third Cod War – fishing dispute with Iceland
 1982 – Falklands War – war with Argentina over the Falkland Islands and other British South Atlantic territory.
 1983 – Condemnation of the United States over its invasion of Grenada.
 1984 – dispute with Libya after a policewoman is shot dead in London by a gunman from within the Libyan embassy and considerable Libyan support for the IRA in Northern Ireland.
 1988 – further dispute with Libya over the 1988 bombing of a Pan Am flight over the Scottish town of Lockerbie
 1991 – Gulf War with Iraq
 1995 – under UN mandate, military involvement in former Yugoslavia (specifically Bosnia)
 1997 – Hong Kong handover to Chinese rule. Britain secures guarantees for a "special status" that would continue capitalism and protect existing British property.
 1999 – involvement in NATO bombing campaign against Yugoslavia over Kosovo
 2000 – British action in saving the UN peacekeeping force from collapse and defeating the anti-government rebellion during the Sierra Leone Civil War
 2001 – UN-sponsored war against, and subsequent occupation of, Afghanistan
 2003 – Collaborate with US and others in war and occupation of, Iraq Over 46,000 British troops subsequently occupy Basra and Southern Iraq
 2007 – (ongoing) diplomatic dispute with Russia over the death of Alexander Litvinenko Additional matters have strained British-Russian relations; continued espionage, Russian human rights violations and support of regimes hostile to the west (Syria, Iran)
 2009 – (ongoing) Dispute with Iran over its alleged nuclear weapons programme, including sanctions and Iranian condemnation of the British government culminating in a 2011 attack on the British Embassy in Iran.
 2011 – under UN mandate, UK Armed Forces participated in enforcing the Libyan No-Fly Zone as part of Operation Ellamy
 2013 – support to French forces in the Malian civil war, including training and equipment to African peacekeeping and Malian government forces.
 2015 – support to US-led coalition against the Islamic State in Iraq and the Levant.
 2016 – P5+1 and EU implement a deal with Iran intended to prevent the country gaining access to nuclear weapons.
 2018 – Sanctions on Russia following the poisoning of Sergei Skripal using a nerve agent in Salisbury, England included the expulsions of 23 diplomats, the largest ever since the Cold War, an act that was retaliated by Russia. A further war of words entailed and relations are deteriorating.
 2019 – The sovereignty of the Chagos Archipelago is disputed between the United Kingdom and Mauritius. In February 2019, the International Court of Justice in The Hague ruled that the United Kingdom must transfer the islands to Mauritius as they were not legally separated from the latter in 1965. On 22 May 2019, the United Nations General Assembly debated and adopted a resolution that affirmed that the Chagos archipelago “forms an integral part of the territory of Mauritius.” The UK does not recognise Mauritius' sovereignty claim over the Chagos Islands. Mauritian Prime Minister Pravind Jugnauth described the British and American governments as "hypocrites" and "champions of double talk" over their response to the dispute.
 2019 – The Persian Gulf crisis escalated in July 2019, when Iranian oil tanker was seized by Britain in the Strait of Gibraltar on the grounds that it was shipping oil to Syria in violation of European Union sanctions. Iran later captured a British oil tanker and its crew members in the Persian Gulf.

Sovereignty disputes

 Spain claims the British overseas territory of Gibraltar.
 The entire Chagos Archipelago in the British Indian Ocean Territory is claimed by Mauritius and the Maldives. The claim includes the island of Diego Garcia used as a joint UK/US military base since the 1970s when the inhabitants were forcibly removed, Blenheim Reef, Speakers Bank and all the other features.
 There are conflicting claims over the Falkland Islands and South Georgia and the South Sandwich Islands, controlled by the United Kingdom but claimed by Argentina. The dispute escalated into the Falklands War in 1982 over the islands' sovereignty, in which Argentina was defeated.
 There is a territorial claim in Antarctica, the British Antarctic Territory, which overlaps with areas claimed by Chile and Argentina.

Commonwealth of Nations

The UK has varied relationships with the countries that make up the Commonwealth of Nations which originated from the British Empire. Charles III of the United Kingdom is Head of the Commonwealth and is King of 15 of its 56 member states. Those that retain the King as head of state are called Commonwealth realms. Over time several countries have been suspended from the Commonwealth for various reasons. Zimbabwe was suspended because of the authoritarian rule of its President and so too was Pakistan, but it has since returned. Countries which become republics are still eligible for membership of the Commonwealth so long as they are deemed democratic. Commonwealth nations such as Malaysia enjoyed no export duties in trade with the UK before the UK concentrated its economic relationship with EU member states.

The UK was once a dominant colonial power in many countries on the continent of Africa and its multinationals remain large investors in sub-Saharan Africa. Nowadays the UK, as a leading member of the Commonwealth of Nations, seeks to influence Africa through its foreign policies. Current UK disputes are with Zimbabwe over human rights violations. Tony Blair set up the Africa Commission and urged rich countries to cease demanding developing countries repay their large debts. Relationships with developed (often former dominion) nations are strong with numerous cultural, social and political links, mass inter-migration trade links as well as calls for Commonwealth free trade.

From 2016 to 2018, the Windrush scandal occurred, where the UK deported a number British Citizens with Commonwealth heritage back to their Commonwealth country on claims they were "illegal immigrants".

Africa

Americas

Asia

Europe
The UK maintained good relations with Western Europe since 1945, and Eastern Europe since end of the Cold War in 1989. After years of dispute with France it joined the European Economic Community in 1973, which eventually evolved into the European Union through the Maastricht Treaty twenty years later. Unlike the majority of European countries, the UK does not use the euro as its currency and is not a member of the Eurozone. During the years of its membership of the European Union, the United Kingdom had often been referred to as a "peculiar" member, due to its occasional dispute in policies with the organisation. The United Kingdom regularly opted out of EU legislation and policies. Through differences in geography, culture and history, national opinion polls have found that of the 28 nationalities in the European Union, British people have historically felt the least European. On 23 June 2016, the United Kingdom voted to leave the European Union and formally left on 31 January 2020.

European Union

Oceania

Overseas Territories

International organisations 

The United Kingdom is a member of the following international organisations:

 ADB - Asian Development Bank (nonregional member)
 AfDB - African Development Bank (nonregional member)
 Arctic Council (observer)
 Australia Group
 BIS - Bank for International Settlements
 Commonwealth of Nations
 CBSS - Council of the Baltic Sea States (observer)
 CDB - Caribbean Development Bank
 Council of Europe
 CERN - European Organization for Nuclear Research
 EAPC - Euro-Atlantic Partnership Council
 EBRD - European Bank for Reconstruction and Development
 EIB - European Investment Bank
 ESA - European Space Agency
 FAO - Food and Agriculture Organization
 FATF - Financial Action Task Force
 G-20 - Group of Twenty
 G-5 - Group of Five
 G7 - Group of Seven
 G8 - Group of Eight
 G-10 - Group of Ten (economics)
 IADB - Inter-American Development Bank
 IAEA - International Atomic Energy Agency
 IBRD - International Bank for Reconstruction and Development (also known as the World Bank)
 ICAO - International Civil Aviation Organization
 ICC - International Chamber of Commerce
 ICCt - International Criminal Court
 ICRM - International Red Cross and Red Crescent Movement
 IDA - International Development Association
 IEA - International Energy Agency
 IFAD - International Fund for Agricultural Development
 IFC - International Finance Corporation
 IFRCS - International Federation of Red Cross and Red Crescent Societies
 IHO - International Hydrographic Organization
 ILO - International Labour Organization
 IMF - International Monetary Fund
 IMO - International Maritime Organization
 IMSO - International Mobile Satellite Organization
 Interpol - International Criminal Police Organization
 IOC - International Olympic Committee
 IOM - International Organization for Migration
 IPU - Inter-Parliamentary Union
 ISO - International Organization for Standardization
 ITSO - International Telecommunications Satellite Organization
 ITU - International Telecommunication Union
 ITUC - International Trade Union Confederation
 MIGA - Multilateral Investment Guarantee Agency
 MONUSCO - United Nations Organization Stabilization Mission in the Democratic Republic of the Congo
 NATO - North Atlantic Treaty Organization
 NEA - Nuclear Energy Agency
 NSG - Nuclear Suppliers Group
 OAS - Organization of American States (observer)
 OECD - Organisation for Economic Co-operation and Development
 OPCW - Organisation for the Prohibition of Chemical Weapons
 OSCE - Organization for Security and Co-operation in Europe
 Paris Club
 PCA - Permanent Court of Arbitration
 PIF - Pacific Islands Forum (partner)
 SECI - Southeast European Cooperative Initiative (observer)
 UN - United Nations
 UNSC - United Nations Security Council
 UNCTAD - United Nations Conference on Trade and Development
 UNESCO -  United Nations Educational, Scientific and Cultural Organization
 UNFICYP - United Nations Peacekeeping Force in Cyprus
 UNHCR - United Nations High Commissioner for Refugees
 UNIDO - United Nations Industrial Development Organization
 UNMIS - United Nations Mission in Sudan
 UNRWA - United Nations Relief and Works Agency for Palestine Refugees in the Near East
 UPU - Universal Postal Union
 WCO - World Customs Organization
 WHO - World Health Organization
 WIPO - World Intellectual Property Organization
 WMO - World Meteorological Organization
 WTO - World Trade Organization
 Zangger Committee - (also known as the) Nuclear Exporters Committee

See also
 Timeline of British diplomatic history
 Timeline of European imperialism
 Anglophobia
 British diaspora
 History of the United Kingdom
 Soft power#United Kingdom
 Foreign, Commonwealth and Development Office
 Heads of United Kingdom Missions
 List of diplomatic missions of the United Kingdom 
 European Union–United Kingdom relations
 Latin America–United Kingdom relations
 United Kingdom–Crown Dependencies Customs Union

References

Bibliography

 Casey, Terrence. The Blair Legacy: Politics, Policy, Governance, and Foreign Affairs (2009)  excerpt and text search
 Daddow, Oliver, and Jamie Gaskarth, eds. British foreign policy: the New Labour years (Palgrave, 2011)
 Daddow, Oliver. "Constructing a ‘great’ role for Britain in an age of austerity: Interpreting coalition foreign policy, 2010–2015." International Relations 29.3 (2015): 303-318.
 Dickie, John. The New Mandarins: How British Foreign Policy Works (2004)
 Dumbrell, John. A special relationship: Anglo-American relations from the Cold War to Iraq (2006)
 Finlan, Alastair. Contemporary Military Strategy and the Global War on Terror: US and UK Armed Forces in Afghanistan and Iraq 2001-2012 (2014)

 Gallagher, Julia. "Healing the scar? Idealizing Britain in Africa, 1997–2007." African Affairs 108.432 (2009): 435-451 online

 Honeyman, V. C. "From Liberal Interventionism to Liberal Conservatism: the short road in foreign policy from Blair to Cameron." British Politics (2015). abstract
 Lane, Ann. Strategy, Diplomacy and UK Foreign Policy (Palgrave Macmillan, 2010)
 Leech, Philip, and Jamie Gaskarth. "British Foreign Policy and the Arab Spring." Diplomacy & Statecraft 26#1 (2015).
 Lunn, Jon, Vaughne Miller, Ben Smith. "British foreign policy since 1997 - Commons Library Research Paper RP08/56" (UK House of Commons, 2008) 123pp online
 Magyarics, Tamas. Balancing in Central Europe: Great Britain and Hungary in the 1920s
 Seah, Daniel. "The CFSP as an aspect of conducting foreign relations by the United Kingdom: With Special Reference to the Treaty of Amity & Cooperation in Southeast Asia]" International Review of Law (2015)   "online
 Seton-Watson, R. W. Britain in Europe (1789–1914): A Survey of Foreign Policy (1937)  online

 Stephens,  Philip.  Britain Alone: The Path from Suez to Brexit (2021) excerpted

 Whitman, Richard G. "The calm after the storm? Foreign and security policy from Blair to Brown." Parliamentary Affairs 63.4 (2010): 834–848.  online
 Williams, Paul. British Foreign Policy under New Labour (2005)

Primary sources
 Blair, Tony. A Journey: My Political Life (2010)

External links
Foreign and Commonwealth Office
Department for International Development